Javad bey Mammad agha oghlu  Shikhlinski (Azerbaijani: Cavad bəy Məmməd Ağa oğlu Şıxlinski; b. January 3, 1874 - d. 1959) is a Azerbaijani military officer, major general, nephew of general Aliagha Shikhlinski, uncle of the writer Ismayil Shykhly.

Life 
Javad bey Shikhlinski was born in the small village of Salahli in the Kazakh district of the Elizavetpol Governorate (now the village of Ashagy-Salakhli in the Kazakh district of Azerbaijan) in the family of a landowner. He came from an ancient noble family, the first mention of which dates back to 1537. He received his general education in the Tiflis Cadet Corps.

Military service

In Russian Imperial Army 
He entered the service on August 28, 1892 as a private Junker cadet at the 2nd Konstantinovsky Military School, from which he graduated in the first category. On August 8, 1894, he was released as a second lieutenant in the 39th artillery brigade, where he was appointed to the position of teacher of a training team. On August 18, 1895, he was sent to the Kazakh district in order to select horses for the brigade. Since November 1897, senior officer of the 3rd battery. He served in Kars and Alexandropol. July 1, 1898 was promoted to Lieutenant. On August 19, 1901 he received the rank of Stabskapitän. On January 1, 1909, the Captain. On March 28, 1904, he was appointed commander of the 5th battery, located in the city of Kars. In March 1911, Captain Shikhlinsky was awarded the Order of St. Stanislav, 2nd degree. On February 21, 1913, in honor of the 300th anniversary of the accession to the throne of the Romanov dynasty, he was awarded a commemorative medal and promoted to lieutenant colonel.

The First World War 
In 1915, lieutenant colonel Javad bey Shikhlinski commanded the 23rd mortar division. February 10, 1916 he was assigned commander of the 4th battery of the 45th artillery brigade. Twice, on March 5, 1916 and October 14, 1916, Javad bey Shikhlinski was honored with the Order of Highest Favor. In 1917, commander of the 1st division of the 45th artillery brigade. April 22, 1917 promoted to colonel.

In Azerbaijani National Army 
At the end of 1917, he returned to Azerbaijan and entered the service in the Muslim Corps, newly formed according to order No. 155 of December 11, 1917, Commander-in-Chief of the Caucasian Front, Infantry General Przhevalsky, renamed on June 26, 1918 by a decree of the Council of Ministers of the Republic of Azerbaijan into a Azerbaijani Special Corps (commander , former commander of the 10th Army of the Western Front, Lieutenant General Aliagha Shikhlinski). He was appointed commander of the 1st artillery brigade. In early July 1918, the corps was disbanded and its units, together with the arrived 5th Caucasian and 15th Chanakhgalin Turkish divisions, became part of the newly formed Caucasian Islamic Army of Nuri Pasha. Colonel D. Shikhlinsky was appointed commander of the 1st artillery regiment. He continued his service in the army of the Azerbaijan Democratic Republic. He served as Assistant Chief of the Artillery Directorate. On February 22, 1919, Colonel Javad bey Shikhlinski was appointed commander, and on June 25 commander of the 1st Infantry Division with promotion to major general. In 1920 he was appointed head of the garrison of the city of Ganja. After invasion of Azerbaijan by Bolsheviks, he became one of the main organizers and leaders of the Ganja revolt in 1920. After the suppression of the uprising, he fled to Georgia, and then in March 1921 he moved to Turkey. In 1923 he entered the Iranian army, where he was appointed commander of the Ardabil garrison.

Awards 
  - 3rd Class Order of Saint Vladimir
  - 4th Class Order of Saint Vladimir
  - 2nd Class Ode of Saint Stanislaus
  - 3rd Class Ode of Saint Stanislaus
  - 2nd Class Order of Saint Anne
  - 3rd Class Order of Saint Anne
  - Medal "In memory of the 300th anniversary of the reign of the Romanov dynasty"
  - Ottoman War Medal

Family 
He was a nephew of general Aliagha Shikhlinski, uncle of the writer Ismayil Shykhly. He also brother of Rustam Shikhlinski and grandson of Mirza Huseyn Afandi Qayibov. The generation to which he belonged was called the  Shikhlinski generation.

Death 
After some years serving in the Iranian army, he was obliged to left Iran to Turkey. In 1959 he died in Türkiye Republic.

See also 
 Masum bey Qayibov

References

1874 births
1959 deaths
Generals of the Azerbaijan Democratic Republic
Azerbaijani nobility
Participants of the Ganja revolt
Deaths in Turkey
Recipients of the Order of St. Vladimir, 4th class
Recipients of the Order of St. Anna, 2nd class
Recipients of the Order of St. Anna, 3rd class
Recipients of the Order of Saint Stanislaus (Russian), 3rd class
Shikhlinskis